David Milhous is a motion picture editor. He is known best as the editor of Crime Watch Daily, which won the Emmy award for Editing in 2017. Milhous has been elected to membership in the American Cinema Editors (ACE)  . He is also a founding member of the American post-punk band Lippy's Garden.

Milhous spent a number of years editing news at CNN in Atlanta before turning to more dramatic long form storytelling at Paramount Pictures and Warner Brothers Entertainment in Hollywood. His work as an editor has aired on CW, CBS, CNBC, NBC, ABC, CNN, Facebook Watch, Fox Broadcasting Company, YouTube, Netflix, HGTV, Discovery, BBC, Five (UK), Virgin1, MTV, MTV2, History Channel, The Learning Channel, Biography, Animal Planet, Spike TV, UPN, A&E, CNN International, IFC, Lifetime, Oxygen, The Africa Channel, The Travel Channel, and The Science Channel.

Milhous cites Alfred Hitchcock, Philip Glass and Henri Cartier-Bresson as his greatest creative influences. He is a lifetime member of the American Film Institute and a member of the Academy of Television Arts & Sciences and American Cinema Editors (ACE).

Education
AFI Conservatory, (MFA) Film Editing
New York University, (BFA) Tisch School of the Arts, Film and Television Production
Attended the University of Southern California, where he was the Assistant Chief Photographer for the Daily Trojan.

Awards
Nominated - Daytime Emmy Award, Multi-Camera Editing, Crime Watch Daily, 2018.

Winner - Daytime Emmy Award, Multi-Camera Editing, Crime Watch Daily, 2017.

Nominated - American Cinema Editors, ACE Eddie Award, AFI, 2001.

External links 
* 
 [ Allmusic.com]
 Deadline
 ACE Members 

1967 births
Living people
University of Southern California alumni
American television editors
Tisch School of the Arts alumni
AFI Conservatory alumni
20th-century American drummers
American male drummers
Television video editors
[[Category:American Cinema Editors]]